Central Governorate may refer to:

 Central Governorate, Bahrain
 Al Wusta Governorate (Oman)

See also
Al Wusta (disambiguation)